Kurangumala (Monkey Hill) is a small sub-village of Kozhencherry town in Pathanamthitta district in Kerala, India.

Kurangumala is a small hill in Kozhencherry. St. Thomas College is near to Kurangumala.

Majority of the population are Christians and Hindus.

References

Villages in Pathanamthitta district